John Davies, Mallwyd ( – 1644) was one of Wales's leading scholars of the late Renaissance. He wrote a Welsh grammar and dictionary. He was also a translator and editor and an ordained minister of the Church of England.

Born in Llanferres, Denbighshire, the son of a weaver, he graduated from Jesus College, Oxford  in 1594. His name is traditionally associated with the parish of Mallwyd, Gwynedd, where he was rector from 1604 until his death in 1644.

He is believed to have been the main editor and reviser of the 1620 edition of the Welsh translation of the Bible and the 1621 edition of the Welsh translation of the Book of Common Prayer.

He published a Welsh grammar in Latin in 1621, Antiquae linguae Britannicae ..., and a Welsh–Latin Latin–Welsh dictionary in 1632, Antiquae linguae Britannicae ... et linguae Latinae dictionarium duplex.

He died, possibly while at Harlech, on 15 May 1644, and was buried at Mallwyd church, where a memorial was erected to him on the 200th anniversary of his death.

References

Sources
'Davies, John (c. 1567–1644)'. In Meic Stephens (Ed.) (1998), The new companion to the literature of Wales. Cardiff: University of Wales Press. .
Davies, Ceri (Ed.) (2004), Dr John Davies of Mallwyd : Welsh Renaissance scholar. Cardiff: University of Wales Press. .
Parry, Thomas (1955), A history of Welsh literature. Translated by H. Idris Bell. Oxford: Clarendon Press.

External links
Early Grammars : Antiquae linguae Britannicae... 1621 part of the Celtic Voices exhibition at the National Library of Wales
John Davies, 'Antiquae Linguae Britannicae ....' (1621), from the Gathering the jewels website

1560s births
1644 deaths
Welsh-language writers
Welsh lexicographers
Alumni of Jesus College, Oxford
Translators of the Bible into Welsh
People from Denbighshire
17th-century Welsh writers
17th-century male writers
16th-century translators
17th-century translators
Welsh translators
16th-century Anglican theologians
17th-century Anglican theologians
Early modern Christian devotional writers